Edward Dean Kennedy (born January 18, 1963) is a Canadian former professional ice hockey player. Kennedy played in the National Hockey League (NHL) from 1982 to 1995 for the Los Angeles Kings, New York Rangers, Buffalo Sabres, Winnipeg Jets and Edmonton Oilers.

Career statistics

External links
 

1963 births
Living people
Canadian ice hockey defencemen
Brandon Wheat Kings players
Buffalo Sabres players
Edmonton Oilers players
Ice hockey people from Saskatchewan
Los Angeles Kings draft picks
Los Angeles Kings players
New York Rangers players
Saskatoon Blades players
Weyburn Red Wings players
Winnipeg Jets (1972–1996) captains
Winnipeg Jets (1979–1996) players